Rajan Srinivasan Mahadevan (born 1957) is an Indian mnemonist.

Early life 
Mahadevan was  born in Madras in 1957 and moved to Mangalore in 1959. He discovered his ability to memorize numbers at the age of 5 during a party hosted by his family. During the party, Rajan wandered to a parking lot and committed the license plate numbers of every guest's car for recitation later.

Education 
In 1977, after losing interest in engineering, Mahadevan set to memorize substantial parts of pi. On 5 July 1981, he recited from memory the first 31,811 digits of pi. pi. This secured him a place in the 1984 Guinness Book of World Records, and he has been featured on Larry King Live and Reader's Digest.

Mahadevan received his bachelor's degree in psychology in 1984 and his master's degree in clinical psychology from the University of Mysore in 1986 during his extended participation in memory study. Mahadevan's digit span was found to be nearly ten times the average; it is estimated that, before the effects of practice, it was 15 digits.

Although Mahadevan is adept at remembering numbers, he nevertheless displays only an average memory when it comes to prose passages or geometric shapes.

Mahadevan holds the position of Distinguished Lecturer at the University of Tennessee, where he teaches courses in learning and thinking as well as cognitive psychology.

See also 
 Ben Pridmore
 Dominic O'Brien
 Sri Vyshnavi Yarlagadda
 Grand Master of Memory
 Mnemonic major system

References

Notes 
 "Unexceptional spatial memory in an exceptional memorist", Biederman et al., Journal of Experimental Psychology Learn Mem Cogn, 1992 May;18(3):654-7. 
 "The Man With the Endless Memory;Rajan Mahadevan Is Trying to Memorize 100,000 Digits. For Him, It's Easy as Pi", Washington Post article 18 June 1989. 
 "Memory Search by a Memorist", Thompson et al. Lawrence Erlbaum Associates, Inc.,New Jersey, 1993

Living people
1957 births
Sportspeople from Chennai
University of Mysore alumni
Indian mnemonists
Nationality missing
Sportspeople from Mangalore